Pārdaugava (literally means "Trans" or "Over" -Daugava area) is an area most often associated with Riga, composed of several neighbourhoods on the west (left) bank of Daugava River. The name is literally translated as 'over Daugava'.

In the late Soviet period (around 1990) in Riga appeared several sports teams with such name and previously were associated with the Soviet Daugava club (originally associated with Soviet Dynamo sports society). Those were football team FK Pārdaugava and hockey team Dinamo Riga (original).

References

Neighbourhoods in Riga